Porvenir Municipality is a municipal section of the Nicolás Suárez Province in the Pando Department, Bolivia. Its seat is Porvenir. It was the site of the Porvenir Massacre on September 11, 2008. It is also the birthplace, Ana Lucía Reis.

References 

  Instituto Nacional de Estadistica de Bolivia  (INE)

Municipalities of Pando Department